Plaut is a surname, and may refer to:

 Gunther Plaut, American reform rabbi
 Jonathan V. Plaut, American reform rabbi
 Karl Plauth, German flying ace of WWI
 Richard Plant, American writer (born Plaut) 
 Steven Plaut, Israeli academic